Earl Thomas Booker IV (born November 11, 1999) is an American football defensive end for the Houston Texans of the National Football League (NFL). He played college football at Stanford.

College career
Booker was a four-star recruit coming out of Gilman School, having grown up in Ellicott City, Maryland. He was then a three-year starter for Stanford, playing in 43 games. In his final season he had 59 tackles and 1.5 sacks, totalling 159 tackles and 10 sacks for his career, along with 20.5 tackles for loss, two fumble recoveries, one forced fumble, and one interception. He was named to All-Pac-12 teams in each of his last 3 seasons and was a finalist for the William V. Campbell Trophy.

Professional career

In the run-up to the 2022 NFL Draft Booker was seen as a high level developmental prospect, expected to play as a rotational defensive lineman. Booker was drafted in the fifth round (150th overall) by the Houston Texans. The Texans expect Booker to play defensive tackle.

References

External links
 Houston Texans bio
 Stanford Cardinal bio

1999 births
Living people
American football defensive ends
American football defensive tackles
Stanford Cardinal football players
Houston Texans players